The Assistant PGA Professional Championship is a golf tournament for golf club assistant professionals. It was called the PGA Assistant Championship until 2016 and has been held by the PGA of America since 1977. Rules for 2007 have the field made up of the assistant champions from each PGA section, section qualifiers, the defending champion and a representative from the PGA of Australia, The Professional Golfers' Association and the Canadian PGA. The 2015 Champion was Andy Mickelson. Notable players who won this event before competing on the PGA Tour include Loren Roberts (eight PGA Tour wins), Fred Funk (eight PGA Tour wins, most notably the 2005 Players Championship), and Wes Short Jr. (one PGA Tour win)

Winners

 PO  - Won in playoff

References

External links
Official site
Media Guide

Golf tournaments in the United States